Galtha is a 2020 Tamil-language political thriller directed by Hari Uthraa. The film  stars Sivanishanth, Ayra, and Antony, and is based on several true incidents of illegal dumping of medical waste and other hazardous waste form neighboring states such as Kerala on Tamilnadu border districts such as Puliyarai and Valliyoor in Tirunelveli district and border villages of Coimbatore.

Plot 
The plot of the film revolves around a fictional village called Thannilankadu and the political influence on the villages where the waste is being dumped. With the help of local political influence the trucks with medical and other waste are illegally transported through Tamil Nadu checkpost while returning from Kerala. The story travels on a village backdrop on how these hazardous waste causes numerous health problems and a sudden outbreak of an unknown virus and how the people are reacting to the situation.

Cast  
 Sivanishanth as Lenin 
 Ayra as Isaiarasi 
 Merku Thodarchi Malai Antony as Guna 
 Divya 
 Appukutty 
 Gajaraj as Church father
 Kaaka Muttai Sasi Kumar 
 SMT Karunanidhi
Tiger Garden Thangadurai
Muthuveera
Suresh

Release 
The Times of India gave the film one out of five stars and wrote that "There is amateurishness on all fronts, from the writing to the acting to the scoring". Dinamalar praised the background music while criticizing the shortcomings of the story. Maalaimalar praised the music and cinematography.

References

External links 
 

Indian political thriller films